The 2019 Russian regional elections took place on 8 September 2019 for the election of governors in 19 subjects, among which 16 by direct votes and 3 by indirect votes, and of legislatives bodies in 13 subjects.

State Duma by-elections

Novgorod constituency

Komsomolsk-na-Amure constituency

Serov constituency

Oryol constituency

Gubernatorial elections

Direct election 
 Altai Republic
 Astrakhan Oblast
 Bashkortostan Republic
 Chelyabinsk Oblast
 Kalmykia Republic
 Kurgan Oblast
 Kursk Oblast
 Lipetsk Oblast
 Murmansk Oblast
 Orenburg Oblast
 Saint Petersburg Federal City
 Sakhalin Oblast
 Stavropol Krai
 Volgograd Oblast
 Vologda Oblast
 Zabaykalsky Krai

Indirect election 
Crimea Republic (20 September)
Ingushetia Republic
Kabardino-Balkaria Republic (3 October)

Regional legislative elections 

 Altai Republic State Assembly
 Bryansk Oblast Duma
 Crimea State Council 
 Kabardino-Balkaria Parliament
 Karachay-Cherkessia People's Assembly
 Khabarovsk Krai Legislative Duma
 Mari El Republic State Assembly
 Sevastopol Legislative Assembly
 Tatarstan State Council
 Tula Oblast Duma
 Tuva Great Khural
 Volgograd Oblast Duma

By-Elections 
 Altai Krai Legislative Assembly district 2
 Bashkortostan State Assembly districts 9, 16
 Chuvash Republic State Council district 16
 Kemerovo Oblast Council of People's Deputies district 9
 Khakassia Supreme Council districts 4, 9, 11, 19
 Khanty-Mansi Autonomous Okrug – Yugra Duma district 15
 Kostroma Oblast Duma district 8
 Krasnodar Krai Legislative Assembly district 15
 Krasnoyarsk Krai Legislative Assembly districts 2, 15
 Kursk Oblast Duma district 3
 Lipetsk Oblast Council of Deputies district 24
 Nenets Autonomous Okrug Assembly of Deputies district 8
 Nizhny Novgorod Oblast Legislative Assembly district 20
 Novgorod Oblast Duma district 1
 Omsk Oblast Legislative Assembly districts 4, 14, 19
 Orenburg Oblast Legislative Assembly district 3
 Primorsky Krai Legislative Assembly district 19
 Pskov Oblast Assembly of Deputies district 2
 Samara Oblast Provincial Duma districts 11, 19
 Saratov Oblast Duma district 2
 Smolensk Oblast Duma district 24
 Sverdlovsk Oblast Legislative Assembly district 11
 Tomsk Oblast Legislative Duma districts 5, 16
 Tver Oblast Legislative Assembly district 19
 Tyumen Oblast Duma district 19
 Udmurtia State Council districts 7, 12
 Vologda Oblast Legislative Assembly district 13
 Yamalo-Nenets Autonomous Okrug Legislative Assembly district 8
 Zabaykalsky Krai Legislative Assembly district 20

Municipal 
Saint Petersburg Municipal Councils

See also
2019 Moscow protests

References

 
Regional elections in Russia